Landon Timothy Donovan (born March 4, 1982) is an American former professional soccer player. Donovan is also the co-founder and vice-president of soccer operations for USL Championship side San Diego Loyal SC, and serves as strategic advisor for English side Lincoln City. He was voted as the best U.S. soccer player of all time by a poll conducted by ESPN, along with Major League Soccer having ranked Donovan as the greatest American soccer player of all time.

A former forward, he holds numerous individual records in Major League Soccer (MLS) and for the United States national team and is regarded as the greatest U.S. men's soccer player of all time. Donovan signed for Bayer 04 Leverkusen in 1999. In 2005, after six years with Leverkusen, the majority of which were spent on loan with the San Jose Earthquakes of MLS, Donovan moved back to the United States permanently to sign with the Los Angeles Galaxy. He later returned to Germany for a loan with Bayern Munich, and twice went on short loans to English Premier League club Everton in 2010 and 2012. He retired as a player in 2014, but made a brief comeback with LA Galaxy late in the 2016 season and then in 2018 to play for Club León. He further played one season with the San Diego Sockers of the Major Arena Soccer League.

In MLS, Donovan won a record six MLS Cups and is the league's all-time assists leader with 136. The Major League Soccer MVP Award has been renamed the Landon Donovan MVP Award in his honor. For the United States men's national team, Donovan is the all-time leader in assists and tied with Clint Dempsey as all-time leader in scoring, and is the second-most-capped player of his country. Donovan is the only American player to reach the 50 goals/50 assists mark.  He is a four-time winner of the U.S. Soccer Athlete of the Year award (the only man to do so and the first man to win in consecutive years), as well as the only seven-time winner of the Honda Player of the Year award. Donovan starred in the U.S. team that reached the quarter-finals of the 2002 FIFA World Cup where he received the Best Young Player Award. His three goals in the 2010 World Cup made Donovan the highest-scoring male American player in World Cup history and one of the three male American players to score in more than one World Cup, along with Brian McBride and Clint Dempsey.

Early life and education
Landon Timothy Donovan was born (along with twin sister Tristan) on March 4, 1982, in Ontario, California, to Donna Kenney-Cash, an American special education teacher, and Tim Donovan, a semi-professional ice hockey player originally from Canada. Donovan's parents are both of Irish descent, and he holds Canadian citizenship by way of his father. His mother raised Landon and his siblings in Redlands, California, and he attended Redlands East Valley High School when not engaged in soccer activities elsewhere.

Donovan first played soccer with his older brother and when Donovan was six, his mother allowed him to join an organized league, where he scored seven goals in his first match. Donovan was a member of Cal Heat – a club based in nearby Rancho Cucamonga, California. In 1997, he was accepted into U.S. Youth Soccer's Olympic Development Program. In 1999 Donovan attended the IMG Academy in Bradenton, Florida, with other members of the U-17 national team as part of U.S. Soccer's youth development program. Donovan was a member of the inaugural class of the U.S. Soccer youth residency program in Bradenton, Florida. He was named Player of the Tournament for his role in the United States under-17 squad that finished fourth in the 1999 FIFA U-17 World Championship before signing with German club Bayer Leverkusen later that year.

Club career

Bayer Leverkusen and San Jose Earthquakes

Later in 1999, Donovan signed a six-year contract for German Bundesliga club Bayer Leverkusen, whose sporting director Michael Reschke spotted him at a youth tournament in Europe. Despite becoming a regular starter for the club's reserve team upon arrival, Donovan had trouble adapting to life overseas and was allowed extended training periods with United States youth national teams. He played in a German Cup match for the reserve team. Unhappy with his situation with Leverkusen, Donovan was loaned to the San Jose Earthquakes of Major League Soccer (MLS) for the 2001 season. In MLS, Donovan had immediate success, leading the Earthquakes to MLS Cup championships in 2001 and 2003 and becoming one of the only recognizable faces of soccer in the United States. In four years in the league, he scored 32 goals and 29 assists in league play, and ten goals and six assists in the playoffs. Two of those goals were in the 2003 MLS Cup, a 4–2 Earthquakes triumph over Chicago Fire SC. Donovan earned Man of the Match for his actions. He was named U.S. Soccer Athlete of the Year in 2003.

In 2004, Donovan became the first man to be named the U.S. Soccer Athlete of the Year three years in a row before returning to the Bayer Leverkusen first team in January 2005. After playing seven matches with Leverkusen in the 2004–05 season, only two of which were starts, Donovan requested to leave the club. Despite a late offer from English Premier League club Portsmouth, Donovan expressed a desire to return to the United States. Upon his re-entry to MLS, San Jose was denied the chance to re-sign Donovan because Earthquakes general manager Alexi Lalas had traded away his rights. LA Galaxy, his hometown team, were able to trade leading scorer Carlos Ruiz to FC Dallas to get on top of the MLS allocation order as Donovan prepared to leave Germany.

LA Galaxy

2005–2014
Donovan signed a multi-year contract with LA Galaxy, making him the highest-paid American player in the league. In his first season at the club, Donovan scored 12 league goals with 10 assists and added four goals and an assist in the playoffs as LA Galaxy won the MLS Cup (his third MLS championship to date). He was named to the MLS All-Time Best XI after the season. In his second season with LA Galaxy, Donovan scored 12 league goals and 8 assists. He also scored three goals in the Open Cup. Despite this, Donovan and LA Galaxy failed to make the playoffs and lost in the Open Cup to  Chicago Fire SC. Donovan's playoff goals make him MLS' second all-time leading scorer in the playoffs with 14, behind Carlos Ruiz's 15.

Donovan had a mixed year with LA Galaxy in 2007. Upon the signing and arrival of David Beckham, Donovan relinquished his captaincy to the English superstar. In the 2007 SuperLiga tournament, Donovan was the top scorer. He scored a goal in every match except for the final. He scored six goals in five matches. At this point in his career, Donovan had 84 all-time regular season goals putting him in seventh place on the league's all-time scoring list. Although the 2008 season was a disappointment for LA Galaxy, it was a banner year for Donovan as he scored 20 goals and 9 assists in 25 matches, forming a strong offensive partnership with David Beckham and Edson Buddle.

After his former national team manager Bruce Arena was named LA Galaxy head coach and Beckham joined Milan on loan in early 2009, Donovan once again was given the club captaincy on a permanent basis. In July 2009, Donovan received praise and criticism for his critical comments about Beckham in Sports Illustrated journalist Grant Wahl's book The Beckham Experiment, calling Beckham a poor captain and teammate. He later apologized to Beckham for discussing his concerns to a reporter rather than to him directly. The two reconciled upon Beckham's mid-season return to Los Angeles and Donovan enjoyed an outstanding 2009 campaign, winning the league's Most Valuable Player and MLS Goal of The Year 2009 award and leading LA Galaxy to MLS Cup 2009, which they lost on penalties. Following the season, Donovan agreed to a four-year extension to his contract with LA Galaxy, with clauses that allow him to seek loans during the MLS offseason. On August 1, 2010, Donovan scored the 100th goal of his MLS career. On September 18, 2010, he became the all-time leading scorer for LA Galaxy.

LA Galaxy had another successful campaign in 2010 winning the Supporters' Shield for the first time since 2003. In that campaign, Donovan scored 7 goals and a team-high 16 assists.  In the playoffs, LA Galaxy would ultimately succumb to FC Dallas in the semi-finals.

In 2011, LA Galaxy again won the MLS Supporter's Shield. In the 2011 MLS Cup, Donovan scored the title-clinching goal in the 72nd minute over the Houston Dynamo, securing his fourth MLS Cup title.
Donovan was named the MLS Cup MVP.

In October 2012, Donovan expressed his desire to take a break from his professional soccer career, citing physical and mental exhaustion as the main reasons. In LA Galaxy's next match, the 2012 MLS Cup, a rematch with Houston, Donovan converted a penalty kick in the 65th minute of play to give LA a 2–1 lead. The goal was Donovan's fifth in MLS Cup Finals. LA Galaxy went on to win their second straight MLS Cup, 3–1.

Donovan returned to training with LA Galaxy on March 25, 2013, and made his season debut five days later against Toronto FC, coming on as a 61st-minute substitute. However, upon his return, it was announced he would be forced to relinquish the captaincy to Robbie Keane for the 2013 season. He scored two goals against Chivas USA, tying him with Jeff Cunningham together as the top MLS goalscorer with 134 goals. On May 25, 2014, Donovan scored twice against the Philadelphia Union to break Cunningham's record of 134, making Donovan MLS's All-Time leading goalscorer with 136 goals. On August 6, 2014, he scored the winning goal at the 2014 MLS All-Star Game, putting the ball past Bayern Munich goalkeeper Manuel Neuer at the 70th minute, he was subsequently substituted for Sporting Kansas City striker Dom Dwyer and gave the captain's armband to Canadian international Will Johnson. On August 7, 2014, Donovan announced he would be retiring at the end of the 2014 Major League Soccer season; the season ended with LA Galaxy winning their fourth MLS Cup of the Donovan era on December 7, 2014.

Loans to other clubs

In November 2008, Donovan trained with Bayern Munich, before joining the German club on loan until the start of the 2009 MLS season in mid-March. During his stay with Bayern, Donovan had appearances in five friendly matches, in which he scored four goals, six league matches and one DFB-Pokal match. At the end of the loan period, Bayern declined to extend his loan.

After the 2009 MLS season had finished, Donovan joined English Premier League side Everton on loan in January 2010, though there was strong suggestions he could join his American teammates at Fulham. During this period, he played in 13 matches in all competitions, scored two goals and was named the club's Player of the Month for January. Everton were keen on extending his loan deal, but LA Galaxy refused, and Donovan returned to the U.S. in time for the start of the 2010 MLS season.

An agreement was reached in December 2011 for Donovan to spend another two months at Everton beginning in January 2012. He made his returning debut on January 4, 2012, against Bolton Wanderers, a 2–1 defeat. In his third match on loan, he assisted Everton's only goal in a 1–1 draw against Aston Villa on January 14. On January 27, he assisted in both goals in a 2–1 win over Fulham in the FA Cup fourth round proper. On January 31, he assisted in Darron Gibson's winning goal over Manchester City. Donovan took his tally of assists to seven when he assisted Denis Stracqualursi's goal in a 2–0 victory over Chelsea on February 11.

Return to LA Galaxy
On September 8, 2016, Donovan announced his return from retirement and officially signed with LA Galaxy for the remainder of the 2016 season (six regular season games and any consecutive play-off matches).

Donovan explained that the injuries sustained by the club late in the season led to his decision to return:

Two weeks ago, I was working as an analyst on the LA Galaxy vs. Vancouver Whitecaps match and during that game, LA Galaxy suffered injuries to three players: Jelle Van Damme, Steven Gerrard and Gyasi Zardes. Over the next few days, Nigel De Jong was transferred to Galatasaray and news broke that Gyasi would be out for the rest of the season.

Since my retirement, I have remained in close contact with many of the staff and players on LA Galaxy. I spoke with some of them that week and they jokingly asked if I was ready to make a return to the field to help fill some of the void left by the injuries and departures.

I reminded them that I haven't played a meaningful soccer game in almost two years and I certainly couldn't fill the holes left by those players. Over the ensuing days, I began to think about their inquiries and it struck me that perhaps this is something I should consider. I care so deeply about the Galaxy organization, and I believe I could help in a small way to aid the team in its quest for a sixth MLS championship.

On September 11, 2016, Donovan entered the match against Orlando City as a substitute on the 83rd minute. As his traditional number 10 was worn by Giovani dos Santos, Donovan selected number 26, which he wore at Bayer Leverkusen when he began his career in 1999.

Donovan scored a goal in his second match after returning to LA Galaxy. On September 18, 2016, he came on as a substitute in the 74th minute in a match against Sporting Kansas City and scored two minutes later to tie the game 2–2.

Altogether, Donovan played in all six remaining matches of the 2016 regular season, as well as in all three play-off matches. He started in five of them and scored one goal. At the end of the play-off run, Donovan retired for the second time.

Club León

On January 12, 2018, Donovan signed with Liga MX team Club León, having returned from retirement for a second time. He made his Liga MX debut on February 10, 2018, coming on as a substitute in the 83rd minute of León's 2–1 victory over Club Puebla. He scored his first goal for the club on March 24, 2018, in a friendly against his former team, the San Jose Earthquakes On June 17, 2018, Club León announced they had decided to terminate Donovan's contract early.

San Diego Sockers

On January 24, 2019, Donovan signed with the San Diego Sockers in the Major Arena Soccer League. He provided an assist in a 6–4 win over the Tacoma Stars during his MASL debut on February 15 in front of a record crowd in Pechanga Arena San Diego. He scored his first two goals for the Sockers in the next game for a 13–2 win over Turlock Express, opening the scoring after just 12 seconds. Donovan was named to MASL's Week 14 Team of the Week and also named him as a 2018–2019 All-MASL Top Newcomer.

International career

Donovan was a member of the inaugural class at U.S. Soccer's full-time residency program for the under-17 national team at the IMG Academy in Bradenton, Florida. In his two years playing for the U-17 team, he scored 35 goals in 41 games and won the Golden Ball at the 1999 FIFA U-17 World Championship as the tournament's best player. He also represented the United States at the 1999 Pan American Games. In 2000, he moved up to both the United States U-23 men's national soccer team as well as the senior team. Despite this he played for the United States U-20 men's national soccer team in 2001. On March 20, 2001, he was involved in a collision with Marvin Lee, the captain of Trinidad and Tobago U-20 team during the 2001 CONCACAF U-20 Tournament in Trinidad. Lee collided head to side with Donovan which resulted in Lee being paralyzed after sustaining neck and spine injuries, while Donovan had fractured ribs.  Lee died in 2003 from complications caused by his condition, the stadium now carries his name.

Donovan made his World Cup finals debut in the 2002 World Cup starting in the shock upset of pre-tournament favorites Portugal, a match the Americans won 3–2. Donovan's cross in the 29th minute deflected in off Jorge Costa, giving the U.S. a 2–0 lead. Later, Donovan would tally his first World Cup finals goal in the 83rd minute of a 3–1 loss to Poland in the third match of the group stage. He then scored his second goal of the tournament on a header which clinched a 2–0 round of 16 victory for the Americans over arch-rival Mexico. Though the U.S. would go on to lose 1–0 to Germany in the quarter-finals, Donovan would later be named Best Young Player of the tournament.

Donovan was a member of the U.S. squad at the 2006 World Cup, in which the Americans were eliminated in the group stage.  Failing to provide any goals or assists throughout the three matches, he was widely criticized by American viewers for his performance. The following year, he led the U.S. to the 2007 Gold Cup title with four goals, including a crucial penalty in the 2–1 victory over Mexico in the final. On January 19, 2008, Donovan scored his 35th international goal, a penalty against Sweden, and passed Eric Wynalda as the United States' all-time leading goal scorer. Donovan reached 100 caps at age 26 on June 8, 2008, in a friendly against Argentina that ended in a 0–0 draw, becoming the fourth-youngest person to do so. Donovan captained the U.S. in the group stage of the 2009 FIFA Confederations Cup due to Carlos Bocanegra's injury absence. Donovan scored on a penalty kick against Italy, shortly after his team had been reduced to ten men, and scored for the U.S. in a 3–2 defeat to Brazil in the final. On October 10, 2009, Donovan scored on a free-kick, giving the U.S. a 3–2 victory over Honduras in San Pedro Sula that clinched World Cup qualification.

Donovan played every minute of the U.S. campaign at the 2010 FIFA World Cup in South Africa. He scored against Slovenia with a powerful close-range finish to begin a U.S. comeback for a 2–2 draw, and the only goal in the dying seconds of a 1–0 defeat of Algeria with a finish off a rebounded Clint Dempsey attempt, leading the U.S. to first place in their World Cup group for the first time since 1930. Donovan scored a penalty in the round of 16 against Ghana as the U.S. lost 2–1 after extra time and were eliminated from the competition. His goals in South Africa made Donovan the highest scoring American male in World Cup history, and just the third American man to score in more than one World Cup, after Brian McBride and Clint Dempsey.  His total of five World Cup goals is the most for any man representing a team from CONCACAF.

After missing the first two World Cup qualifiers of 2013 due to his extended off-season sabbatical, Donovan was left off of the squad by Jürgen Klinsmann for the June qualifying matches, despite having returned to playing full-time in March. However, Donovan was re-called to the national team for the 2013 CONCACAF Gold Cup to be played in July. On July 5, 2013, he became the first U.S. player to reach the 50 international goal mark and the fourth man in CONCACAF to score 50 international goals after a brace against Guatemala in a warmup friendly before the Gold Cup. Four days later, Donovan became the first player to reach 50 goals and 50 assists for the United States during a 6–1 group stage victory in their 2013 Gold Cup opener against Belize in which he had one goal and two assists. After the U.S. won the Gold Cup title with a 1–0 victory over Panama, Donovan was awarded the tournament's Best Player trophy after tying for the tournament lead with five goals scored. He started every match of the tournament for the United States. Donovan was recalled to the full national squad for the first time in over a year for the U.S.'s September World Cup qualifying matches against Costa Rica and Mexico. Donovan started and played 90 minutes in both games. With the U.S. needing a win over Mexico to clinch qualification, Donovan's corner kick assisted Eddie Johnson's go-ahead goal in the 57th minute. Then, in the 78th minute, Donovan scored off a low cross from Mix Diskerud to make the score 2–0, and effectively seal the win, and the World Cup berth.

In May 2014, Donovan was named in the preliminary squad for the 2014 World Cup and joined the team in training camp. However, on May 22, 2014, he was controversially omitted from the final U.S. squad by manager Jürgen Klinsmann. Donovan's absence from the team even became the comedic subject of a PlayStation Commercial where Donovan makes light of his newly found free time. Klinsmann later called his decision "one of the toughest decisions in [his] coaching career", but said, "I just think the other guys right now are a little bit ahead of him." Klinsmann's decision, which was described by media staff as abruptly timed after Klinsmann had previously promised to wait until after the team's friendly matches to announce cuts, saw additional controversy when Klinsmann's son Jonathan published and later deleted a post on Twitter that appeared to ridicule Donovan following the announcement.

On October 10, 2014, Donovan played his 157th and final match for the United States in a friendly against Ecuador in East Hartford, Connecticut. The match was arranged by United States Soccer Federation president Sunil Gulati to give Donovan a proper farewell, despite the disagreement between Donovan and Klinsmann. Following his retirement, he was named by The Guardian as the U.S. team's greatest ever player.

After playing in the Major Arena Soccer League during the 2018–19 season, Donovan was named to the United States national arena soccer team ahead of a friendly against Mexico.

Style of play
Donovan was a versatile attacker known for his pace and stamina as well as intelligence and technical skill, allowing him to play at various forward and midfield positions at different points of his career. His longtime international and club manager Bruce Arena was once quoted as saying, "the problem with Landon is that he's your best player at so many positions that you never know where to put him."

Particularly in the early parts of his career, Donovan played as a withdrawn striker and was most noted for his quickness and goalscoring ability. As his professional career progressed, Donovan was increasingly utilized by managers as a wide attacking midfielder, where he could additionally benefit the team with his playmaking abilities, passing vision, and defensive work rate. Donovan also provided capable delivery on set pieces (as well as occasionally scoring from direct kicks) and served as first-choice penalty taker for club and country for much of his career.

Coaching career

MLS Homegrown Game 
In July 2015, it was announced Donovan had been appointed as head coach for a team consisting of young MLS players for the 2015 MLS Homegrown Game. The game took place on July 28, 2015, at Dick's Sporting Goods Park in Commerce City, Colorado. Donovan led a team of MLS academy graduates, assembled just one day prior, to a 1–1 regulation tie, followed by a 4–5 shootout loss, as reported online. Donovan selected and coached the team a second time in the 2016 edition of the event.

San Diego Loyal SC 
On November 14, 2019, Landon Donovan was named the inaugural manager of the San Diego Loyal, a team that he helped co-found and was the vice president of soccer operations. Noting that his hiring was a risk for the club because he had never coached before, Donovan surrounded himself with an experienced backroom staff. He brought on former coach Paul Buckle and former United States women's national soccer team player Shannon MacMillan as senior advisors to his staff. While also bringing in experienced coaches in Carrie Taylor, Nate Miller, and Matt Hall to his staff. Donovan noted that he wanted a staff with experienced coaches because they could aid him with the day-to-day responsibilities with a coaching role that he was unfamiliar with.

During his first season in charge, Donovan lead San Diego to 6-5-5 record. Donovan and the Loyal garnered international headlines when they forfeited the last two matches of the season after having alleged instances of racial and homophobic abuse directed at their players by the Los Angeles Galaxy II and Phoenix Rising respectively went unpunished. After the second instance, where Phoenix Rising player Junior Flemmings allegedly directed a homophobic slur against openly gay San Diego player Collin Martin,  Donovan stated: "We went through a really hard incident in the LA match and we made a vow to ourselves, our community, our players, the club and the USL that we would not stand for bigotry, homophobic slurs and things that don't belong in our game. Our players in the heart and passion of the moment still wanted to play, but if we wanted to be true to who we are as a club, we have to speak and we have to act. After half-time we all decided if the player who used the homophobic slur was not removed from the game – either by the officials or by his coach – we would not play. If they are not willing to act, we have to act."

On December 2, 2022, Donovan was elevated to full-time Executive Vice President of Soccer Operations for Loyal. Associate head coach Nate Miller was promoted to head coach.

Off the field career

Broadcasting career 
After being left off the 2014 World Cup roster for the United States, Donovan joined the ESPN broadcast team for the World Cup as a studio analyst. After his retirement, Donovan became a color commentator for FOX Sports, participating in the network's coverage of the United States–Ecuador quarter-final of the Copa América Centenario.

San Diego Loyal SC (Ownership and Leadership) 
Donovan, along with Warren Smith, a co-founder of Sacramento Republic FC, founded a USL Championship expansion team in June 2019. The team debuted in the USL Championship in 2020. Warren Smith will be the president, while Donovan will be the executive vice president of soccer operations and head coach of the new club. Provisionally named USL San Diego, the team's name and crest would be developed through fan engagement and reflect the interests of the city. On November 2, 2019, the team announced their branding and naming themselves San Diego Loyal SC.

Lincoln City F.C. 
On 17 June 2021, it was announced that Donovan would be joining Lincoln City as a Strategic Advisor, working with the Board, Chief Executive Liam Scully and Director of Football Jez George to enhance the club's network and relationships, particularly within North America.

Personal life
Donovan married actress Bianca Kajlich on December 31, 2006; the couple separated in July 2009, and Donovan filed for divorce in December 2010. In May 2015, he married Hannah Bartell. They welcomed their first child, son Talon, in January 2016. Donovan has spoken publicly about dealing with depression throughout his life and career, and has criticized the professional sports world for its approach to mental health issues.

Since joining the Galaxy, Donovan has resided in Manhattan Beach, California. He speaks fluent Spanish, which he learned both in school and through playing in Hispanic clubs and leagues while growing up in California. He also speaks German as a result of his time spent in Germany. After his two brief stints playing for Everton in which he became a fan favorite, Donovan declared himself an "Evertonian for life".

He was featured on the North American covers of the FIFA 11 and FIFA 12 video games.

In 2016, Donovan became a part owner of Welsh football club Swansea City, joining several other Americans in an investment group that has a majority stake in the club.

Donovan revealed during the 2018 FIFA World Cup that he was a fan of fierce rival Mexico in the absence of the United States national team, having been sponsored to do so by Wells Fargo. He was widely criticized, including from his former international teammate Carlos Bocanegra, who Donovan responded back that he should "remember where you came from" in reference to Bocanegra's Mexican heritage.

In 2020, Donovan appeared as a contestant on the game show Game On!

Career statistics

Club

International

Coaching statistics

Honors
San Jose Earthquakes
 MLS Cup: 2001, 2003

LA Galaxy
 MLS Cup: 2005, 2011, 2012, 2014
 Supporters' Shield: 2010, 2011
 Lamar Hunt U.S. Open Cup: 2005

United States
 FIFA Confederations Cup: runner-up 2009
 CONCACAF Gold Cup: 2002, 2005, 2007, 2013

Individual
 U.S. Soccer Young Athlete of the Year: 2000
 U.S. Soccer Athlete of the Year: 2003, 2004, 2009, 2010
 Best Male Soccer Player ESPY Award: 2002
 Best MLS Player ESPY Award: 2006, 2007, 2009, 2010, 2011
 Honda Player of the Year: 2002, 2003, 2004, 2007, 2008, 2009, 2010
 FIFA U-17 World Cup Golden Ball: 1999
 FIFA World Cup Best Young Player Award: 2002
 FIFA World Cup All-Star Team: 2002 (Reserve)
 CONCACAF Gold Cup Best XI: 2002, 2003, 2005, 2013; Honorable Mention: 2007
 CONCACAF Gold Cup MVP: 2013
 CONCACAF Gold Cup top scorer: 2003, 2005, 2013
 CONCACAF Gold Cup Best Goal: 2011 (second place)
 LA Galaxy Player of the Year: 2006, 2008, 2009, 2011
LA Galaxy Golden Boot: 2005, 2006, 2007, 2008, 2009, 2011
 LA Galaxy Humanitarian of the Year: 2007, 2008
 Everton Player of the Month: January 2010, January 2012
 MLS All-Time Best XI: Midfielder
 Major League Soccer MVP: 2009
 MLS Player of the Month: September 2003, April 2003, April 2008, July 2009, May 2011, August 2014
 MLS Best XI: 2003, 2008, 2009, 2010, 2011, 2012, 2014
 MLS Cup MVP: 2003, 2011
 MLS All-Star: 2001, 2002, 2003, 2004, 2005, 2007, 2008, 2009, 2010, 2011, 2012, 2013, 2014
 MLS All-Star Game MVP: 2001, 2014
 MLS Golden Boot: 2008
 MLS Silver Boot: 2010
 MLS Goal of the Year: 2009
 Premios Univision Deportes Lifetime Achievement Award: 2014 
 Walt Chyzowych Fund Distinguished Playing Career Award: 2017 
 IFFHS Legends
 MLS Greatest Player of All Time
National Soccer Hall of Fame: 2023

See also 
 List of men's footballers with 100 or more international caps
 List of men's footballers with 50 or more international goals
 List of athletes who came out of retirement
 Landon Donovan MVP Award

References

External links

 
 
 
 
 Landon Donovan at Everton FC
 
 Landon Donovan: USA Soccer Hero – slideshow by Life magazine

1982 births
Living people
American people of Irish descent
American sportspeople of Canadian descent
People from Ontario, California
People from Redlands, California
Sportspeople from Manhattan Beach, California
Soccer players from California
American soccer players
Association football wingers
Association football forwards
American Youth Soccer Organization players
Bayer 04 Leverkusen II players
Bayer 04 Leverkusen players
San Jose Earthquakes players
LA Galaxy players
FC Bayern Munich footballers
Everton F.C. players
Club León footballers
San Diego Loyal SC
San Diego Sockers players
Bundesliga players
Major League Soccer players
Major League Soccer All-Stars
Designated Players (MLS)
Premier League players
Liga MX players
Major Arena Soccer League players
United States men's youth international soccer players
United States men's under-20 international soccer players
United States men's under-23 international soccer players
Olympic soccer players of the United States
United States men's international soccer players
Footballers at the 1999 Pan American Games
Footballers at the 2000 Summer Olympics
2002 CONCACAF Gold Cup players
2002 FIFA World Cup players
2003 FIFA Confederations Cup players
2003 CONCACAF Gold Cup players
2005 CONCACAF Gold Cup players
2006 FIFA World Cup players
2007 CONCACAF Gold Cup players
2009 FIFA Confederations Cup players
2010 FIFA World Cup players
2011 CONCACAF Gold Cup players
2013 CONCACAF Gold Cup players
Pan American Games bronze medalists for the United States
Pan American Games medalists in football
CONCACAF Gold Cup-winning players
FIFA Century Club
American expatriate soccer players
American expatriate soccer players in Germany
American expatriate sportspeople in England
American expatriate sportspeople in Mexico
Expatriate footballers in England
Expatriate footballers in Mexico
American soccer coaches
San Diego Loyal SC coaches
USL Championship coaches
Medalists at the 1999 Pan American Games